KBO can refer to:

 Kapamilya Box Office, a Philippine free-to-air television channel
 KBÖ, Communist League of Austria
 KBO!, a hardcore punk band from Serbia
 Kuiper belt object(s) (KBO or KBOs); article on objects beyond Pluto in the Solar System 
 Keep the Bastards Out, a fictional organization invented by Seattle Post-Intelligencer columnist Emmett Watson
 Korea Baseball Organization
 KBO League, the baseball major league of Korea
 Kosi Bird Observatory, Nepal
 ISO 639:kbo, Kaliko language of DR Congo and South Sudan
 IATA code of Kabalo Airport, an airport in the Democratic Republic of the Congo

See also

 
 
 KBOS (disambiguation)